In radio frequency (RF) applications such as radio, radar and telecommunications, noise temperature of an antenna is a measure of the noise power density contributed by the antenna to the overall RF receiver system.  It is defined as "The temperature of a resistor having an available thermal noise power per unit bandwidth equal to that at the antenna’s output at a specified frequency."  In other words, antenna noise temperature is a parameter that describes how much noise an antenna produces in a given environment.  This temperature is not the physical temperature of the antenna. Moreover, an antenna does not have an intrinsic "antenna temperature" associated with it; rather the temperature depends on its gain pattern, pointing direction, and the thermal environment that it is placed in.

Mathematics

In RF applications, noise power is defined using the relationship , where k is Boltzmann's constant, T is the noise temperature, and B is the noise bandwidth.  Typically the noise bandwidth is determined by the bandwidth of the intermediate frequency (IF) filter of the radio receiver.  Thus, we can define the noise temperature as:

It is added directly to the effective noise temperature of the receiver to obtain the overall system noise temperature:

Sources of antenna noise

Antenna noise temperature has contributions from many sources, including:
Cosmic background radiation
Galactic radiation
Earth heating
The sun
The moon
Electrical devices
The antenna itself

Galactic noise is high below 1000 MHz.  At around 150 MHz, it is approximately 1000 K.  At 2500 MHz, it has leveled off to around 10 K.

Earth has an accepted standard temperature of 288 K.

The level of the sun's contribution depends on the solar flux.  It is given by

where  is the solar flux,

 is the wavelength,

The antenna noise temperature depends on antenna coupling to all noise sources in its environment as well as on noise generated within the antenna. That is, in a directional antenna, the portion of the noise source that the antenna's main and side lobes intersect contribute proportionally.

For example, a satellite antenna may not receive noise contribution from the earth in its main lobe, but sidelobes will contribute a portion of the 288K earth noise to its overall noise temperature.

See also
Noise Temperature
Johnson–Nyquist noise
Federal Standard 1037C
MIL-STD-188

References

Temperature
Noise (electronics)